Ronald Bryan Coomer (born November 18, 1966), nicknamed "Coom Dawg", is a former first baseman and third baseman in Major League Baseball and the current color analyst and play-by-play broadcaster for the Chicago Cubs radio on WSCR 670 AM. He was elected to the American League All-Star team in 1999 while with the Twins.

During his baseball career he opened up a baseball facility in Orland Park, Illinois, called C.F. Swingtown Baseball Academy, which is no longer owned by Coomer.

Baseball career
Coomer was drafted by the Oakland Athletics in the 14th round of the 1987 amateur draft. After one season, he was released by the A's. He was signed by the Chicago White Sox on March 18, 1991. In 1993, he was traded to the Los Angeles Dodgers for Isidro Márquez. After two seasons in the minors, Coomer was traded to the Minnesota Twins with Greg Hansell and José Parra for Mark Guthrie and Kevin Tapani.

Coomer spent five seasons with the Twins, with whom he made the All-Star team in 1999. After the emergence of third baseman Corey Koskie, Coomer began to lose playing time. In his last year as a Twin, 2000, Koskie started the majority of the games at third and Coomer was shifted to first base.

In 2001, Coomer signed a free-agent contract with the Chicago Cubs. He hit .261/.316/.390 in his only year in Chicago before becoming a free agent.

Coomer signed a one-year deal with the New York Yankees in 2002 as a reserve third baseman. He started 26 games for the Yankees at third. He joined the Dodgers the next year, where he mainly played first base. Coomer's offensive production dipped to .240/.299/.368 and after that year he retired from baseball.

Broadcasting

In 2012 and 2013, Coomer was a color analyst for Fox Sports North, the Minnesota Twins' primary television broadcaster. He also regularly appeared on KTWN-FM, the primary radio affiliate for the Minnesota Twins. On December 12, 2013, it was reported that Coomer would succeed Keith Moreland as the analyst on the Chicago Cubs Radio Network. He is partnered with longtime broadcaster Pat Hughes.

References

External links

Venezuelan Professional Baseball League statistics

1966 births
Living people
Albuquerque Dukes players
American League All-Stars
Baseball players from Chicago
Birmingham Barons players
Caribes de Oriente players
American expatriate baseball players in Venezuela
Chicago Cubs announcers
Chicago Cubs players
Huntsville Stars players
Iowa Cubs players
Los Angeles Dodgers players
Madison Muskies players
Major League Baseball broadcasters
Major League Baseball first basemen
Major League Baseball third basemen
Medford A's players
Minnesota Twins announcers
Minnesota Twins players
Modesto A's players
Nashville Sounds players
New York Yankees players
People from Will County, Illinois
Taft Cougars baseball players
Vero Beach Dodgers players